Peschiera may refer to:

Peschiera, a genus of plants considered to be a synonym of Tabernaemontana
Peschiera Borromeo, in the province of Milan, Italy
Peschiera del Garda, in the province of Verona, Italy
Peschiera del Garda railway station